Krios is a stream (little river) in the municipal unit of Aigeira, in Achaea, southern Greece. Its source is on mount Chelmos, near the village Perithori. It flows near the ancient city of Felloi and the villages Sinevro, Oasi and the Mycenaean acropolis of ancient Aigeira. The stream empties into the Gulf of Corinth near Aigeira.

References

Landforms of Achaea
Rivers of Greece
Rivers of Western Greece
Drainage basins of the Gulf of Corinth